Justice League vs. the Fatal Five is a 2019 American animated superhero film produced by Warner Bros. Animation and DC Entertainment. Featuring the DC Comics team Justice League created by Gardner Fox, the film is the 34th of the DC Universe Animated Original Movies. The film features Elyes Gabel and Diane Guerrero alongside Kevin Conroy, Susan Eisenberg, and George Newbern reprising their roles as Batman, Wonder Woman, and Superman, respectively, from Justice League/Justice League Unlimited.

The film was first announced at San Diego Comic-Con on July 20, 2018, and had its world premiere at WonderCon Anaheim 2019 on March 29, 2019. It was released on Digital HD on March 30, 2019, and on 4K Ultra HD, Blu-ray, and DVD on April 16, 2019.

Plot
In the 31st century, Mano, Tharok and Persuader of the Fatal Five attack the Legion of Super-Heroes' headquarters for their time sphere. Star Boy, Saturn Girl and Brainiac 5 try to keep them back but fail. Just as the villains activate the sphere, Star Boy leaps at them and is taken along. Arriving in the 21st century above Earth, Star Boy triggers a boobytrap Brainiac 5 programmed, trapping the villains inside the sphere in a stasis field. Star Boy comes down in Gotham City while the sphere ends up in Metropolis. Star Boy discovers his supply of medicine, needed to stabilize his mind, was destroyed in his rough landing. As his medicine doesn't exist yet, Star Boy's increasingly erratic behavior gets him apprehended by Batman and sent to Arkham. The stasis-locked time machine is picked up by Superman and brought to the Justice League's headquarters for analysis.

Ten months later, Jessica Cruz is struggling with the trauma of her near-death by a murderer who killed her friends, making her afraid to leave her apartment. Adding to her anxiety is that a Green Lantern ring chose her and that Wonder Woman keeps trying to recruit her into the Justice League. In Gotham, Miss Martian is trying to prove herself to Batman for membership in the League, but her inexperience works against her good intentions. While trying to unlock the secret of the strange sphere, Mister Terrific brings down the stasis field, freeing its occupants. Superman and Mister Terrific fight them, but Superman is wounded by Persuader's axe and the villains escape.

Star Boy's memory is jogged by a news report of the fight, and he breaks out of Arkham. The Justice League members compare notes about these mysterious assailants and discover they are time travelers; and from one of Star Boy's ravings, Batman deduces that they are after Jessica. When the three villains attack Jessica, Star Boy comes to her rescue, followed by Superman, Batman, Wonder Woman, Mister Terrific, and Miss Martian, who force them into flight after a hard struggle. In the aftermath, Star Boy and Jessica form a close friendship.

To find out more about their guest from the future, Batman instructs Miss Martian to telepathically link their and Jessica's minds with Star Boy's memories, thus learning about the Legion. They witness a battle between the Legion-—Chameleon, Dawnstar, Tyroc, Mon-El, Shadow Lass, and, later Brainiac 5, Saturn Girl, and Star Boy-—and the Fatal Five, which ended with the capture of Mano's lover Emerald Empress and Validus; as there was no prison that could hold them in the 31st century, the Legion took them to Oa in the past. Upon their awakening, the League receives an ultimatum from Mano: surrender Jessica or all American cities will be destroyed by bombs created by Tharok. The first bombings start in Metropolis, forcing the Justice League to move out. Left behind with Star Boy in the Watchtower, Jessica is contacted by Tharok through her ring, forcing her to surrender herself to the Five and enable them entry to Oa's prison cells. Despite interference by Kilowog and Salaak, Emerald Empress and Validus are freed, and when Jessica fights back, Persuader cleaves her ring in two. Afterwards, Emerald Empress has her Emerald Eye of Ekron steal all the energy of the Central Power Battery, and the Five return to Earth to recover the time sphere.

In the meantime, Star Boy discovers Jessica's absence and informs the League. The heroes proceed to the time machine's location, a secret US military base, where the Fatal Five force them into battle. Emerald Empress subdues the Justice League and then initiates her master plan to use the Lantern's power to destroy Earth's sun, wipe out humanity, and thus prevent the formation of the Legion in their time. On Oa, Jessica recovers her faith and determination, and by reciting her oath, she reassembles her power ring. Brought back to her apartment by the ring, Jessica flies to the base and prevents the Fatal Five from escaping back to their own era by bringing the whole base down upon them, killing the supervillains.

Superman, Jessica and Star Boy race after the Eye, but are too late to prevent it from plunging into the sun. As the star cracks apart, Star Boy sacrifices himself by lowering himself into the sun's core and using his powers to reverse the fracturing. In the final scene as the Justice League members commemorate Star Boy's heroism, they are joined by the Legion who have come from the future to honor their fallen comrade. Batman also informs Miss Martian that she has been invited to join the Justice League, and she accepts the offer.

Voice cast
 Kevin Conroy as Batman
 George Newbern as Superman
 Elyes Gabel as Thomas Kallor / Star Boy
 Diane Guerrero as Jessica Cruz / Green Lantern
 Susan Eisenberg as Wonder Woman
 Daniela Bobadilla as Miss Martian
 Kevin Michael Richardson as Mr. Terrific, Kilowog (uncredited)
 Tara Strong as Saturn Girl, Harley Quinn (uncredited), Poison Ivy (uncredited)
 Noel Fisher as Brainiac 5
 Sumalee Montano as Emerald Empress
 Philip Anthony-Rodriguez as Mano
 Peter Jessop as Tharok
 Matthew Yang King as The Persuader
 Bruce Timm as Two-Face
 Tom Kenny as Bloodsport, Salaak (uncredited)

Production

The director is Sam Liu, who has directed prior DC animated films. The story was written by Eric Carrasco, partnered with Jim Krieg and Alan Burnett. The film features Kevin Conroy, Susan Eisenberg, and George Newbern reprising their roles as Batman, Wonder Woman, and Superman from Justice League and other DC productions. It was Conroy's final film role before his death on November 10, 2022. Originally, the film was set to use the Phil Bourassa art style and models from Justice League: Crisis on Two Earths, with the voice cast already having done their recordings. However, to avoid confusion with the New 52-based DCAMU movies, the film used the animation models from Justice League/Justice League Unlimited. The main title themes from The Adventures of Batman & Robin, Superman: The Animated Series, Justice League/Justice League Unlimited are included in the score by composers McCuistion, Ritmanis & Carter (all DCAU alumni) to represent their respective characters.

While its canonicity with the greater DCAU is open-ended, executive producer Bruce Timm considers the film to be canon.

Soundtrack
The complete score was released by Dynamic Soundtrack Records on January 15, 2021. It can be purchased via Apple Music and other outlets.

Critical reception

Reviews to the film were generally favorable.

Eric Vilas-Boas, writing for /Film, praised the film's handling of characters with mental health challenges. Roman Julian, writing for MovieWeb, lauded the return of the classic DCAU animation, but criticized the film's "mediocre story".

Sales

The film earned $2,154,235 from domestic Blu-ray sales.

References

External links
 
 Justice League vs The Fatal Five at The World's Finest

2019 animated films
2019 films
American adult animated films
2010s English-language films
2010s American animated films
2010s direct-to-video animated superhero films
2019 direct-to-video films
Films set in 2004
American superhero films
Animated films about time travel
Animated Justice League films
Warner Bros. Animation animated films
Warner Bros. direct-to-video animated films
Films directed by Sam Liu
Films with screenplays by Alan Burnett